José Pereira (born 9 May 1955) is a Portuguese former freestyle swimmer. He competed in four events at the 1976 Summer Olympics.

References

External links
 

1955 births
Living people
Portuguese male freestyle swimmers
Olympic swimmers of Portugal
Swimmers at the 1976 Summer Olympics
Place of birth missing (living people)